Sayeed Iskander (13 January 1953 – 23 September 2012) was a Bangladeshi politician and army major. He was a member of the Bangladeshi parliament from 2001 to 2006, representing the Bangladesh Nationalist Party from the Feni-1 constituency. He was the younger brother of former Prime Minister Khaleda Zia. Iskander was also the founding chairman of Islamic Television.

Early life
Sayeed Iskander was born on 13 January 1953 in Dinajpur. He belonged to a Bengali Muslim family with origins in Fulgazi, Feni District. He was the son of tea-businessman Iskandar Ali Majumder, who was in turn the son of Salamat Ali Majumdar, who was the son of Azgar Ali Majumdar, who was the son of Nahar Muhammad Khan, who was the son of Murad Khan, a 16th-century Middle Eastern immigrant. His mother, Taiyaba Majumder, was from Chandbari (now in Uttar Dinajpur District).

During his time as a student in 1969, Iskander was the general secretary of the Dinajpur unit of East Pakistan Student League. He went on to become the vice president of the Central Committee of the League.

Career
He joined Bangladesh Army in 1974. He retired from the Army in 1982 with the rank of Major.

Iskander then joined the Bangladesh Nationalist Party, a political party founded by his brother-in-law President Ziaur Rahman. After his elder sister Khaleda Zia gave up her seat at the Feni-1 constituency, Iskander competed in a by-election in November 2001 and successfully won a seat in parliament.

Death
He died from lung cancer on 23 September 2012 in New York, United States. He was buried in  Banani Military Graveyard.

References

Bangladesh Nationalist Party politicians
8th Jatiya Sangsad members
Bangladesh Army officers
1953 births
2012 deaths
People from Fulgazi Upazila
21st-century Bengalis
20th-century Bengalis
Bangladeshi people of Middle Eastern descent
21st-century Muslims
20th-century Muslims
Bangladeshi Sunni Muslims
Majumder–Zia family